Podismini is a tribe of "spur-throated grasshoppers" in the family Acrididae. This tribe is unlike others in the subfamily Melanoplinae in that a substantial number of genera occur outside the Americas (but there are about 12 in N. America).

Subtribes and genera
The Orthoptera Species File lists the following:

subtribe Miramellina
Auth.: Rehn & Randell, 1963; mainland Europe, China, Korea, Japan
 Anapodisma Dovnar-Zapolskij, 1932
 Capraiuscola Galvagni, 1986
 Chortopodisma Ramme, 1951
 Cophopodisma Dovnar-Zapolskij, 1932
 Curvipennis Huang, 1984
 Epipodisma Ramme, 1951  - monotypic Epipodisma pedemontana  (Brunner von Wattenwyl, 1882)
 Indopodisma Dovnar-Zapolskij, 1932  - monotypic Indopodisma kingdoni (Uvarov, 1927)
 Italopodisma Harz, 1973
 Miramella Dovnar-Zapolskij, 1932

 Nadigella Galvagni, 1986  - monotypic Nadigella formosanta (Fruhstorfer, 1921)
 Oropodisma Uvarov, 1942
 Pseudoprumna Dovnar-Zapolskij, 1932  - monotypic Pseudoprumna baldensis (Krauss, 1883)
 Rammepodisma Weidner, 1969   - monotypic Rammepodisma natoliae (Ramme, 1939)
 Zubovskya Dovnar-Zapolskij, 1932

subtribe Podismina
Auth.: Jacobson, 1905; N. America, Europe, Asia through to Japan

 Appalachia Rehn & Rehn, 1936
 Booneacris Rehn & Randell, 1962
 Dendrotettix Packard, 1890
 Micropodisma Dovnar-Zapolskij, 1932
 Niitakacris Tinkham, 1936
 Odontopodisma Dovnar-Zapolskij, 1932
 Ognevia Ikonnikov, 1911
 Podisma Berthold, 1827
 Pseudopodisma Mistshenko, 1947
 Yunnanacris Chang, 1940

subtribe Tonkinacridina
Auth.: Ito, 2015; Asia
 Fruhstorferiola Willemse, 1921
 Parapodisma Mistshenko, 1947
 Pedopodisma Zheng, 1980
 Sinopodisma Chang, 1940
 Tonkinacris Carl, 1916

genus group Bradynotae
Auth.: Rehn & Randell, 1963; N. America, E. Asia
 Argiacris Hebard, 1918
 Asemoplus Scudder, 1897
 Bradynotes Scudder, 1880  - monotypic Bradynotes obesa (Thomas, 1872)
 Buckellacris Rehn & Rehn, 1945
 Hebardacris Rehn, 1952
 Hypsalonia Gurney & Eades, 1961
 Kingdonella Uvarov, 1933

incertae sedis

 Anepipodisma Huang, 1984 (monotypic)
 Bohemanella Ramme, 1951 (monotypic)
 Cophoprumna Dovnar-Zapolskij, 1932 (monotypic)
 Dicranophyma Uvarov, 1921
 Eokingdonella Yin, 1984
 Genimen Bolívar, 1917 - India, Indochina
 Gibbitergum Zheng & Shi, 1998 (monotypic)
 Guizhouacris Yin & Li, 2006 (monotypic)
 Liaopodisma Zheng, 1990
 Pachypodisma Dovnar-Zapolskij, 1932
 Paratonkinacris You & Li, 1983 - E. China
 Peripodisma Willemse, 1972
 Phaulotettix Scudder, 1897
 Podismodes Ramme, 1939 (monotypic)
 Prumna Motschulsky, 1859
 Prumnacris Rehn & Rehn, 1944 (monotypic)
 Pseudozubovskia Zheng, Lin, Zhang & Zeng, 2014 (monotypic)
 Qinlingacris Yin & Chou, 1979 - E. China
 Rectimargipodisma Zheng, Li & Wang, 2004 (monotypic)
 Rhinopodisma Mistshenko, 1954 - Himalayas
 Taipodisma Yin, Zheng & Yin, 2014 - Taiwan
 Xiangelilacris Zheng, Huang & Zhou, 2008 (monotypic)

References

Further reading

External links

 NCBI Taxonomy Browser, Podismini

Melanoplinae
Orthoptera tribes